Equestrian sports are among those contested at the Summer Olympic Games. Equine events began at the Olympics in 1900, when competitions in polo (considered by the International Olympic Committee (IOC) to be a separate sport from the other equestrian events), vaulting, four-in-hand driving, mail coach driving, mixed hacks and hunters and three types of jumping (high jump, long jump and show-jumping) were held. Most of these events were later discontinued, although equestrian events have continued through the 2016 Summer Olympics, and now include team and individual dressage, three-day eventing and show-jumping. Competitors in the modern pentathlon event also have to complete an equestrian show-jumping course, but this is not part of the equestrian events.

Modern-day Olympic equestrian events are rooted in cavalry skills and classical horsemanship, and through 1948, competition was restricted to active-duty officers on military horses. Only after 1952, as mechanization of warfare reduced the number of military riders, were civilian riders allowed to compete. Equestrian is the only Olympic sport in which animals compete with humans, and is one of four sports in which the genders compete against each other, the others being some sailing divisions, mixed doubles division in tennis and the mixed doubles division of badminton. The rules for Olympic equestrian competition are set by the Fédération Équestre Internationale, the international governing body for equestrian sports.

In two instances, the equestrian portion of the Olympics has been held in a different location from the rest of the games. The first was during the 1956 Summer Olympics in Melbourne, Australia when, due to Australian quarantine laws, the equestrian portion was held in Stockholm, Sweden. At the next IOC meeting, it was decided to hold a special Equestrian Olympic Games several months before the actual Olympics, complete with its own opening and closing ceremonies. This meant that Switzerland, which had officially boycotted the 1956 Games because of the Soviet Union's recent invasion of Hungary, still brought home a medal because of its participation in the equestrian portion several months earlier. The second instance was during the 2008 Summer Olympics, when the equestrian events were held in Hong Kong rather than Beijing. This decision was made when, in 2005, international veterinary groups refused to certify the main Olympic city as free of equine diseases. This would have resulted in horses leaving Beijing after the games and having to go through lengthy quarantine processes before being allowed to re-enter their home countries. Hong Kong also had the benefit of having better facilities, including a top equine hospital and one of only a few equine drug-testing labs in the world.

The Summer Olympics have included 2,129 equestrian participants, including 1,751 men and 378 women, from 69 countries., of which 564 won a medal. As of the 2008 Olympics, 395 medals have been awarded to 31 NOCs. The oldest rider was 72-year-old Arthur von Pongracz of Austria at the 1936 Summer Olympics, while the youngest was 16-year-old Luiza Almeida of Brazil at the 2008 Summer Olympics. The leading medalist is Isabell Werth of Germany (10, 6 gold), followed by  Anky van Grunsven of the Netherlands (9, 3 gold), and Reiner Klimke of Germany (8, 6 gold). Germany leads the country medalist rankings with 25 gold medals (52 overall), followed by Sweden with 17 (43 overall) and France with 14 (37 overall). Canadian rider Ian Millar holds the record for the most Olympic equestrian appearances and matches the record for athletes in any sport, having competed in ten Olympics as of 2012.

Dressage

Dressage, individual 
{| 
|-
|1912 Stockholm
| 
| 
| 
|-
|1920 Antwerp
| 
| 
| 
|-
|1924 Paris
|
| 
| 
|-
|1928 Amsterdam
| 
|
| 
|-
|1932 Los Angeles
| 
| 
| 
|-
|1936 Berlin
| 
| 
| 
|-
|1948 London
| 
| 
| 
|-
|1952 Helsinki
| 
| 
| 
|-
|1956 Stockholm
|
| 
| 
|-
|1960 Rome
| 
| 
| 
|-
|1964 Tokyo
| 
| 
|
|-
|1968 Mexico City
| 
| 
| 
|-
|1972 Munich
| 
| 
| 
|-
|1976 Montreal
| 
| 
| 
|-
|1980 Moscow
| 
| 
| 
|-
|1984 Los Angeles
| 
| 
| 
|-
|1988 Seoul
| 
| 
| 
|-
|1992 Barcelona
| 
| 
| 
|-
|1996 Atlanta
| 
| 
| 
|-
|2000 Sydney
| 
|
| 
|-
|2004 Athens
| 
| 
| 
|-
|2008 Beijing
| 
| 
| 
|-
|2012 London
|
|
|{{flagIOCathlete|Laura Bechtolsheimer  on Mistral Højris|GBR|2012 Summer}} 
|-
|2016 Rio de Janeiro
|
|
|
|-
|2020 Tokyo
|
|
|
|-
|2024 Paris
|
|
|
|-
|}

 Dressage, team 

Discontinued events
Mixed hacks and hunters combined
This event was contested only at the 1900 Summer Games. The IOC website currently has affirmed a total of 95 medal events, after accepting, as it appears, the recommendation of Olympic historian Bill Mallon regarding events that should be considered "Olympic".

Medal table

Eventing
Eventing, individual

Eventing, team

Medal table

Jumping
Jumping, individual

Jumping, team
{| 
|-valign="top"
|1912 Stockholm
|  Gustaf Lewenhaupt  on Medusa  Gustaf Kilman  on Gåtan  Hans von Rosen  on Lord Iron  Fredrik Rosencrantz  on Drabant|  Pierre Dufour d'Astafort  on Amazone  Jacques Cariou  on Mignon  Ernest Meyer  on Allons-y  Gaston Seigner  on Cocotte|  Sigismund Freyer  on Ultimus  Wilhelm Graf von Hohenau  on Pretty Girl  Ernst Deloch  on Hubertus  Prince Friedrich Karl of Prussia  on Gibson Boy|-valign="top"
|1920 Antwerp
|Claës König  on TresorHans von Rosen  on Poor BoyDaniel Norling  on Eros IIFrank Martin  on Kohort|Henri Laame  on BiscuitAndré Coumans  on LisetteHerman de Gaiffier d'Hestroy  on MissHerman d'Oultromont  on Lord Kitchener|Ettore Caffaratti  on TradittoreAlessandro Alvisi  on Raggio di SoleGiulio Cacciandra  on FortunelloCarlo Asinari  on Varone|-valign="top"
|1924 Paris
|Åke Thelning  on LokeAxel Ståhle  on CecilÅge Lundström  on Anvers|Alphonse Gemuseus  on LucetteWerner Stuber  on GirandoleHans Bühler  on Sailor Boy|António Borges  on ReginaldHélder de Souza  on AvroJosé Mouzinho  on Hetrugo|-valign="top"
|1928 Amsterdam
| José Navarro Morenés  on Zapatazo  José Álvarez de Bohórquez  on Zalamero  Julio García Fernández de los Ríos  on Revistade| Kazimierz Gzowski  on Mylord  Kazimierz Szosland  on Ali  Michał Antoniewicz  on Readgleadt| Karl Hansén  on Gerold Carl Björnstjerna  on Kornett Ernst Hallberg  on Loke|-
|1932 Los Angeles|| colspan="3" style="text-align:center;"|No medalists (no nation completed the course with three riders).|-valign="top"
|1936 Berlin
| Kurt Hasse  on Tora  Marten von Barnekow  on Nordland  Heinz Brandt  on Alchimist| Johan Greter  on Ernica  Jan de Bruine  on Trixie  Henri van Schaik  on Santa Bell| José Beltrão  on Biscuit  Domingos de Sousa  on Merle Blanc  Luís Mena e Silva  on Fossette|-valign="top"
|1948 London
| Humberto Mariles  on Arete  Rubén Uriza  on Harvey  Alberto Valdés  on Chihuchoc| Jaime García  on Bizarro  José Navarro Morenés  on Quórum   Marcellino Gavilán  on Forajido| Harry Llewellyn  on Foxhunter  Henry Nicoll  on Kilgeddin  Arthur Carr  on Monty|-valign="top"
|1952 Helsinki
| Wilfred White  on Nizefela  Douglas Stewart  on Aherlow  Harry Llewellyn  on Foxhunter| Óscar Cristi  on Bambi  César Mendoza  on Pillán   Ricardo Echeverría  on Lindo Peal| William Steinkraus  on Hollandia  Arthur McCashin  on Miss Budweiser  John William Russell  on Democrat|-valign="top"
|1956 Stockholm
| Hans Günter Winkler  on Halla  Fritz Thiedemann  on Meteor  Alfons Lütke-Westhues  on Ala| Raimondo D'Inzeo  on Merano  Piero D'Inzeo  on Uruguay   Salvatore Oppes  on Pagoro| Wilfred White  on Nizefela  Pat Smythe  on Flanagan  Peter Robeson  on Scorchin|-valign="top"
|1960 Rome
| Hans Günter Winkler  and Halla  Fritz Thiedemann  and Meteor  Alwin Schockemöhle  and Ferdl| Frank Chapot  and Trail Guide  William Steinkraus  and Ksar d'Esprit   George H. Morris  and Sinjon| Raimondo D'Inzeo  and Posillipo  Piero D'Inzeo  and The Rock  Antonio Oppes  and The Scholar|-valign="top"
|1964 Tokyo
|Hermann Schridde  and Dozent II  Kurt Jarasinski  and Torro  Hans Günter Winkler  and Fidelitas|Pierre Jonquères d'Oriola  and Lutteur B  Janou Lefèbvre  and Kenavo D  Guy Lefrant  and Monsieur de Littry|Piero D'Inzeo  and Sun Beam  Raimondo D'Inzeo  and Posillipo  Graziano Mancinelli  and Rockette|-valign="top"
|1968 Mexico City
|Jim Day  and Canadian Club  Thomas Gayford  and Big Dee  Jim Elder  and The Immigrant|Jean Rozier  and Quo Vadis  Janou Lefèbvre  and Rocket  Pierre Jonquères d'Oriola  and Nagir|Hermann Schridde  and Dozent II  Alwin Schockemöhle  and Donald Rex  Hans Günter Winkler  and Enigk|-valign="top"
|1972 Munich
|Fritz Ligges  and Robin Gerhard Wiltfang  and Askan  Hartwig Steenken  and Simona  Hans Günter Winkler  and Trophy|William Steinkraus  and Main Spring  Neal Shapiro  and Sloopy  Kathryn Kusner  and Fleet Apple  Frank Chapot  and White Lightning|Vittorio Orlandi  and Fulmer Feather  Raimondo D'Inzeo  and Fiorello  Graziano Mancinelli  and Ambassador  Piero D'Inzeo  and Easter Light|-valign="top"
|1976 Montreal
|Hubert Parot  and Rivage Jean-Marcel Rozier  and Bayard de Maupas  Marc Roguet  and Belle de Mars  Michel Roche  and Un Espoir|Alwin Schockemöhle  and Warwick Rex  Hans Günter Winkler  and Torphy  Sönke Sönksen  and Kwepe  Paul Schockemöhle  and Agent|Eric Wauters  and Gute Sitte  François Mathy  and Gai Luron  Edgar-Henri Cuepper  and Le Champion  Stanny Van Paesschen  and Porsche|-valign="top"
|1980 Moscow
|Vyacheslav Chukanov  and GepatitViktor Poganovsky  and TopkyViktor Asmaev  and ReisNikolai Korolkov  and Espadron|Marian Kozicki  and BremenJan Kowalczyk  and ArtemorWiesław Hartman  and NortonJanusz Bobik  and Szampan|Joaquín Perez Heras  and AlymonyJesus Gomez Portugal  and MassacreValencia Gerardo Tazzer  and CaribeAlberto Valdes Lacarra  and Lady Mirka|-valign="top"
|1984 Los Angeles
|Joseph Fargis  and Touch of ClassConrad Homfeld  and AbdullahLeslie Burr Howard  and AlbanyMelanie Smith  and Calypso|Michael Whitaker  and Overton AmandaJohn Whitaker  and Ryans SonSteven Smith  and Shining ExampleTimothy Grubb  and Linky|Paul Schockemöhle  and DeisterPeter Luther  and LiviusFranke Sloothaak  and FarmerFritz Ligges  and Ramzes|-valign="top"
|1988 Seoul
|Ludger Beerbaum  and The FreakWolfgang Brinkmann  and PedroDirk Hafemeister  and OrchideeFranke Sloothaak  and Walzerkonig|Greg Best  and Gem TwistLisa Ann Jacquin  and For the MomentAnne Kursinski  and StarmanJoseph Fargis  and Mill Pearl|Hubert Bourdy  and MorgatFrédéric Cottier  and Flambeau CMichel Robert  and La FayettePierre Durand Jr.  and Jappeloup de Luze|-valign="top"
|1992 Barcelona
|Piet Raijmakers  and Ratina ZBert Romp  and Waldo EJan Tops  and Top GunJos Lansink  and Egano|Boris Boor  and Love Me TenderJoerg Muenzner  and Graf GrandeHugo Simon  and Apricot DThomas Fruehmann  and Genius|Hervé Godignon  and Quidam de RevelHubert Bourdy  and Razzina du PoncelMichel Robert  and NonixEric Navet  and Quito de Baussy|-valign="top"
|1996 Atlanta
|Franke Sloothaak  and Joly CoeurLars Nieberg  and For PleasureUlrich Kirchhoff  and Jus De PommesLudger Beerbaum  and Ratina Z|Peter Leone  and LegatoLeslie Burr Howard  and ExtremeAnne Kursinski  and ErosMichael R. Matz  and Rhum|Luiz Felipe De Azevedo  and CassianaÁlvaro Miranda Neto  and AspenAndré Johannpeter  and CaleiRodrigo Pessoa  and Tomboy|-valign="top"
|2000 Sydney
|Ludger Beerbaum  on GoldfeverLars Nieberg  on Esprit FRHMarcus Ehning  on For PleasureOtto Becker  on Dobels Cento|Markus Fuchs  on Tinka's BoyBeat Maendli  on PozitanoLesley McNaught  on DulfWilli Melliger  on Calvaro V|Rodrigo Pessoa  on Baloubet du RouetLuiz Felipe De Azevedo  on RalphÁlvaro Miranda Neto  on AspenAndré Johannpeter  on Calei|-valign="top"
|2004 Athens
|Peter Wylde  on Fein CeraMcLain Ward  on SapphireBeezie Madden  on AuthenticChris Kappler  on Royal Kaliber|Rolf-Göran Bengtsson  on Mac KinleyMalin Baryard  on Butterfly FlipPeter Eriksson  on CardentoPeder Fredericson  on Magic Bengtsson|Otto Becker  on Dobels CentoMarco Kutscher  on Montender 2Christian Ahlmann  on Cöster|-valign="top"
|2008 Beijing
|McLain Ward  on SapphireLaura Kraut  on CedricWill Simpson  on Carlsson vom DachBeezie Madden  on Authentic|Jill Henselwood  on Special EdEric Lamaze  on HicksteadIan Millar  on  In StyleMac Cone  on Ole|Christina Liebherr  on No MercyPius Schwizer  on Nobless MNiklaus Schurtenberger  on CantusSteve Guerdat  on  Jalisca Solier|-valign="top"
|2012 London
|Scott Brash  on Hello SanctosPeter Charles  on VindicatBen Maher  on Tripple XNick Skelton  on Big Star|Marc Houtzager  on TaminoGerco Schroder  on LondonMaikel van der Vleuten  on VerdiJur Vrieling  on Bubalu
|Ramzy Al Duhami  on Bayard Van the Villa ThereAbdullah bin Mutaib Al Saud  on DavosKamal Bahamdan  on Noblesse Des TessAbdullah Waleed Sharbatly  on Sultan
|-valign="top"
|2016 Rio de Janeiro
|Philippe Rozier  on Rahotep de ToscaneKevin Staut  on Rêveur de HurtebiseRoger-Yves Bost  on Sydney une PrincePénélope Leprevost  on Flora de Mariposa|Kent Farrington  on VoyeurLucy Davis  on BarronMcLain Ward  on HH AzurBeezie Madden  on Cortes 'C'|Christian Ahlmann  on Taloubet ZMeredith Michaels-Beerbaum  on FibonacciDaniel Deusser  on First ClassLudger Beerbaum  on Casello
|-valign="top"
|2020 Tokyo
|Henrik von Eckermann  on King EdwardMalin Baryard-Johnsson  on IndianaPeder Fredricson  on All In
|Laura Kraut  on BaloutinueJessica Springsteen  on Don Juan van de DonkhoeveMcLain Ward  on Contagious
|Pieter Devos  on Claire ZJérôme Guery  on Quel Homme de HusGrégory Wathelet  on Nevados S
|-
|2024 Paris
|
|
|
|-
|}

Discontinued events
High jump

Long jump

Medal table

Discontinued disciplines
Driving

Mail coach
This event was also known as the "Mixed four-in-hand", and appears that way in some references. The event was contested only at the 1900 Summer Games. The IOC website currently has affirmed a total of 95 medal events, after accepting, as it appears, the recommendation of Olympic historian Bill Mallon regarding events that should be considered "Olympic".

Vaulting

Individual

Team

Medal table for discontinued disciplines

Statistics

Athlete medal leaders

Athletes who have won at least five medals are listed below.

Notes

ReferencesCitationsSources'''

Equestrian
Medalists
Olympic medalists in equestrian